The Canarias Challenge was a golf tournament on the Challenge Tour, played in Spain. It was held between 1994 and 1997 at Las Palmas Golf Club in the Canary Islands.

Winners

References

External links
Coverage on the Challenge Tour's official site

Former Challenge Tour events
Golf tournaments in Spain
1994 establishments in Spain
1997 disestablishments in Spain